Peter Morland Churchill,  (14 January 1909 – 1 May 1972) was a British Special Operations Executive (SOE) officer in France during the Second World War. His wartime operations, which resulted in his capture and imprisonment in German concentration camps, and his subsequent marriage to fellow SOE officer, Odette Sansom, received considerable attention during the war and after, including a 1950 film.

Early life and career
Churchill's father was William Algernon Churchill (1865–1947), a British Consul who served in Mozambique, Amsterdam, Pará in Brazil, Stockholm, Milan, Palermo, and Algiers. His father was also an art connoisseur, and author of what is still the standard reference work on early European paper and papermaking, Watermarks in Paper,. His mother was Violet (née Myers). He was a brother of Walter Churchill, a Royal Air Force pilot during the war, and Oliver Churchill, who was also an SOE officer.

Churchill was born in Amsterdam, Netherlands, on 14 January 1909. He was educated at Malvern College from 1923–27, then spent 18 months at Chillon Castle, then went on to Geneva University. From 1929–32, he read Modern Languages at Caius College, University of Cambridge. In addition to his native English, he was bilingual in French and fluent in Spanish and Italian. He also excelled in sports – he had the reputation of being one of the finest ice-hockey blues the university had produced. Churchill was Captain of the Cambridge University Ice Hockey Club in 1932 and won 15 international caps. He was proficient at exhibition diving, was a first-class skier, and played golf off a six handicap.

He moved into the British diplomatic service and served as British Vice-Consul in the Netherlands from 1934–5, and Pro-Consul in Oran, Algeria from 1935–6. From September 1939 to August 1940, he was Under Secretary to Sir Norman Birkett in the Home Office Advisory Committee, and later became President of the Committee.

Wartime activities
 After the outbreak of the Second World War, Churchill and three colleagues embarked aboard HMS Unbroken on 11 April 1941, and were dropped off by folboats in the Bay of Antibes on 20 April. That same night he returned to the submarine with François d'Astier de La Vigerie (Baron d′Astier de la Vigerie), who went by the name of Bernard.

He continued his work as an Intelligence Officer and joined the Special Operations Executive in June 1941, assigned to the French Section. His code names were "Michel", "Raoul" and "Pierre Olivier". He was infiltrated into France four times, twice by submarine and twice by aircraft.

Part of Churchill’s first mission in France in January and February 1942 was to deliver 300,000 francs to Georges Duboudin, organizer of the SPRUCE network in Lyon, and Virginia Hall introduced Churchill to him. Churchill returned to England via Spain when the mission was complete, and Hall accompanied him by train to Perpignan, since couples aroused less suspicion. He then crossed the Pyrenees on foot, and she returned to Lyon. In his second mission in April 1942, Churchill dropped off four SOE agents on the Cote d'Azur by submarine, including Edward Zeff, wireless operator for the SPRUCE network; Hall introduced him to the network.

On 27 August 1942, he was parachuted into the south of France and went to Cannes to organise and coordinate the SOE F Section "Spindle" Network. He developed a close relationship with his courier, Odette Sansom. The Spindle Network directed the delivery of supplies to support Carte. After Churchill's unsuccessful attempts to arrange for an aircraft to pick up himself and members of the Carte network, he relocated the Spindle network to Annecy. They were joined there by several other members of the Carte network and SOE, a gathering which attracted the attention of the Italian fascist police and the Gestapo. SOE agent Francis Cammaerts visited Annecy briefly in March or early April 1943 and assessed the security of Churchill's network as deficient and likely to be penetrated by the Germans. Churchill later described his French friends as “brilliant” but “too talkative for safety.”    

Eventually the Abwehr infiltrated Spindle. Churchill went to England for consultations on 23–24 March 1943 and on 15 April parachuted back into the mountains above Saint-Jorioz on the banks of Lake Annecy. On April 16, he and Sansom were arrested at a hotel in St. Jorioz by Hugo Bleicher of the Abwehr. 

Churchill and Sansom claimed they were a married couple and related to Winston Churchill to make themselves seem more valuable as prisoners and less likely to be executed as spies. In fact, Peter Churchill was not related to the British prime minister. They were sent to different concentration camps, where they were tortured and sentenced to death. Sansom was imprisoned at Ravensbrück. 

Churchill was first taken to the German barracks in Annecy, then to Fresnes, where he remained until 13 February 1944, when he was transferred to Berlin for questioning. At some point, he was tortured on the fifth floor of number 84 in Paris. On 2 May, he was sent to Sonderlager “A” Sachsenhausen, where he was held in solitary confinement for 318 days out of 11 months. On 1 April 1945, he was moved by train to Flossenbürg, 50 miles south-east of Bayreuth, where he was held for 3–4 days before being taken by truck and Black Maria on a 30-hour trip to Dachau where he was lodged in the former official (now empty) brothel at the Dachau concentration camp along with other officers of various nationalities, including the Italian General Garibaldi and his Chief of Staff, Colonel Ferraro. The next day, as the Americans were approaching Dachau, Churchill and 30 other officers were taken by bus to Innsbruck, where he was held in the Straflager. They were joined by 140 other notable prisoners (the Prominenten), including former Austrian Chancellor, Dr. Kurt Schuschnigg. On 24 April 1945, Churchill was taken from Dachau over the Brenner Pass to Villabassa (Niederdorf in the Tyrol), together with many other prominent concentration camp inmates from different countries, where the SS left the prisoners behind as American forces were approaching.

On 27 April, he was taken 15 miles to the south to Wildsee, where on 4 May he was liberated by the Fifth United States Army. He was taken to Naples for debriefing by officers from the Crimes Investigations Departments and testified against his former captors. On 12 May 1945, Churchill was flown back to England in the personal aircraft of Air Marshal Garrow.

Post-war and controversy
In the 1950 film Odette, which recounted their wartime exploits, Churchill was played by Trevor Howard and Anna Neagle played the title role. The fame that the movie brought to Odette Sansom and Peter Churchill also brought criticism from his former associates in SOE and the French Resistance. A document signed by about 20 of his associates accused Churchill of being in France only to collect material for a book about his experiences and asked what acts of sabotage he and Odette had carried out. The official historian of SOE, M.R.D. Foot offered a mild defence of Churchill, saying he was in France to liaise between the Carte network and the London headquarters of SOE and not to carry out sabotage. One of the signers of the document, Baron Henri Ravel of Malval, accused Churchill of causing his arrest by "stupidity."     

Peter Churchill and Odette Sansom were married in London in 1947, but divorced in 1955. Churchill continued to live in France after the war, settling in Le Rouret near Cannes, where he worked in real estate. He lived there until his death from cancer at age 63.

Books by Peter Churchill
 Of Their Own Choice (1952)
 Duel of Wits (1953)
 The Spirit in the Cage (1954)
 By Moonlight (1958)
 All About the French Riviera (1960)

Other books
 Churchill, Peter, Duel of Wits, New York, G.P. Putnam's Sons, U.S. edition (combining British editions of Duel of Wits and Of Their Own Choice), 1955.
 Churchill, Peter, Spirit in the Cage, New York, G.P. Putnam's Sons, U.S. edition, 1955

References

External links
Biography of Peter Churchill at Nigel Perrin's site
Newsreel footage of marriage to Odette Sansom, 1947
Five images of Peter Churchill and Odette at Getty Images
Portrait of Peter Churchill by Mark Gerson at National Portrait Gallery, London

1909 births
1972 deaths
Military personnel from Amsterdam
People educated at Malvern College
French Resistance members
Companions of the Distinguished Service Order
Recipients of the Croix de Guerre 1939–1945 (France)
Sachsenhausen concentration camp survivors
Alumni of Gonville and Caius College, Cambridge
British Special Operations Executive personnel
World War II prisoners of war held by Germany
British Army personnel of World War II
Intelligence Corps officers